Wansbeck was a local government district in south-east Northumberland, England. Its main population centres were Ashington, Bedlington and Newbiggin-by-the-Sea.

The area which was bounded by the district is mostly urban, on the North Sea coast north of the Tyneside conurbation. It bordered Blyth Valley district to the south, the border being the River Blyth. It was formed on 1 April 1974, under the Local Government Act 1972, by the merger of the urban districts of Ashington, Bedlingtonshire and Newbiggin-by-the-Sea. It is named after the River Wansbeck.

The district council was abolished as part of the 2009 structural changes to local government in England effective from 1 April 2009 with responsibilities being transferred to Northumberland County Council, a unitary authority.

Notable people
Sean Taylor, professional footballer

See also
Wansbeck District Council elections

External links
Statistics about the Wansbeck district from the Office for National Statistics Census 2001

English districts abolished in 2009
Former non-metropolitan districts of Northumberland